Legislative elections were held in French Polynesia on 3 November 1957 for the Territorial Assembly. The result was a victory for the ruling Democratic Rally of the Tahitian People (RDPT) led by Pouvanaa a Oopa, which won 17 of the 30 seats.

Results

Elected members

Aftermath
Following the elections, Jean-Baptiste Céran-Jérusalémy was elected President of the Assembly on 10 December. A new government was formed later in the month, including Walter Grand who had lost heavily in the Windward Islands constituency running on the France Tahiti list.

However, following protests about an income tax law, the government was sacked by Governor Camille Victor Bailly in April 1958. Bailly subsequently appointed a new government led by Alfred Poroi.

Following the death of Tautu Oopa in 1961, his wife Céline won a by-election on 8 October 1961, becoming the first woman to sit in the Assembly.

References

French Polynesia
Elections in French Polynesia
1957 in French Polynesia
November 1957 events in Oceania